Brigadier José Antonio de Pareja y Mariscal (December 7, 1757 in Cabra, Spain – May 21, 1813 in Chillán, Chile) was a senior Spanish naval officer. He captained the Argonauta during the Battle of Trafalgar (1805) and in 1812 commanded Royalist troops during the Chilean War of Independence (1810–26).

Biography

Youth and early career
Pareja was born in Cabra, near Córdoba, Spain and was fascinated with the Navy from childhood. He enlisted as a midshipman in 1771 and sailed in several naval task forces, attending many actions. He distinguished himself by taking the islands of St. Peter and St. Antiochus. From February 1778 to May 1782 he commanded a frigate and a private vessel as well as a brig. His wife was Josepha Septien.

In 1782 Pareja had fought with the British fleet and at Melilla, his ships on several occasions landing artillery, ammunition and food and at one point suffering a horrific fire. As commander of the frigate Perla he found himself involved in the naval Battle of Cape St Vincent (February 14, 1797). In the Bay of Algiers a galley under his command fired for eight hours at the Moors.

Trafalgar
In 1803 Pareja commanded the ship San Agustin and in February 1805 he acquired the ship of the Prince of Asturias and sailed to Cadiz with the combined fleets of France and Spain under the command of Admiral Villeneuve and Lieutenant General Gravina. There he was given command of the Argonauta. The following October 20 he sailed with the combined fleet of the same generals, and found himself in combat against the English Admiral Lord Nelson at Cape Trafalgar (21 October 1805). Argonauta suffered immense damage and sank the second day of the battle, which led to numerous deaths and injuries, including the injury of the Captain himself. Later that year Pareja was promoted to Brigadier.

In June 1808, Pareja witnessed the battle and surrender of the French fleet of Admiral Rosily. After a period of leave in Madrid he was sent back to the department of Cadiz in 1809. He then commanded the ships Terrible and San Justo and in early 1810 all the forces of the Isla de León.

Chile
Pareja commanded the island until July 1810 when he was appointed Governor and Captain-General of Chile, then in full insurrection. Pareja arrived in Lima in 1811 as Governor-Intendant of the Chilean province of Concepción. There was, however, a change in plan. At the directive of the José Fernando de Abascal, Viceroy of Peru, whose authority included the provinces of Chile, Pareja organized an expedition against Chiloé and Valdivia which had declared their independence. In late February 1813, Pareja gathered 2,400 men and took the little port of San Vicente, adjacent to Talcahuano. He then immediately marched upon Concepción, which he took possession of with the aid of the native militia. He augmented his forces to about 4,000 soldiers and at once marched upon Chillán which surrendered without a fight and swelled his army with another 2,000 soldiers.

In the meantime, Brigadier José Miguel Carrera, head of the Independentist government, had organized the resistance in Santiago. Both armies met at the Battle of Yerbas Buenas (April 27, 1813). The Independentists, who had attempted a night surprise, were forced to retreat. Pareja, sick with pneumonia, then decided to retreat himself back to Chillán. He was already so sick that he had to be carried on a stretcher. In Chillán he had to submit to a prolonged siege. While there, the port of Talcahuano was recaptured by the Independentists, who also managed to capture the frigate Tomas which was coming from Callao with re-enforcements. Pareja, already weakened by his pneumonia and aggrieved by these reverses, died shortly afterward. His command of the Royalist army was assumed by Juan Francisco Sánchez.

Legacy
Pareja's son, Vice Admiral José Manuel Pareja (1813–1865) commanded the Spanish fleet during the Chincha Islands War (1864–1866).

See also
Chilean Independence

References
This article incorporates material from Volume 42 of the Universal Illustrated European-American Encyclopedia (Espasa) (Enciclopedia Universal Ilustrada Europeo-Americana), which, with a pre-1929 copyright, is in the public domain.

1757 births
1813 deaths
People from the Province of Córdoba (Spain)
Royalists in the Hispanic American Revolution
Spanish generals
Spanish commanders of the Napoleonic Wars
Spanish military personnel of the Chilean War of Independence